Lyday is a surname. Notable people with the surname include:

Allen Lyday (born 1960), American football player
Terrell Lyday (born 1979), American basketball player

See also
Lydy